The Real World: San Diego is the twenty-sixth season of MTV's reality television series The Real World, which focuses on a group of diverse strangers living together for several months in a different city each season, as cameras follow their lives and interpersonal relationships. It is the sixth season of The Real World to be filmed in the Pacific States region of the United States, specifically in California after The Real World: Hollywood.

The season featured a cast of seven people who lived in a house located in the San Diego suburb of La Jolla. It is the sixth season to take place in a city that had hosted a previous season, as the show's fourteenth season was set in San Diego in 2004. It is also the fifth season to be located in California. San Diego was first reported as the location for the 26th season when a moving company posted pictures of the house on their blog in May 2011, and said it would be used for the series. Production began from June to September 9, 2011 and the season premiered on September 28 of that year, consisting of 12 episodes.

Assignment
Most seasons of The Real World, beginning with its fifth season, have included the assignment of a season-long group job or task to the housemates, continued participation in which has been mandatory to remain part of the cast since the Back to New York season. This season, the cast works at the House of Blues.

The residence

The cast resided in a beach house at 5212 Chelsea Street in La Jolla, California, a neighborhood of San Diego, which belongs to an unnamed celebrity who vacated it for the production's use, and removed his belongings from the residence because he "didn’t want any of his valuables destroyed by the Real World’s notoriously wreckless [sic] cast members." The two story, eight-bedroom house features a large set living room, small pool, a patio overlooking the ocean, and a tennis court on the top deck.

Cast

 Age at time of filming

Episodes

After filming
The Real World: San Diego Reunion aired on December 21, 2011. Maria Menounos hosted, and featured the entire cast, as they discussed their time during filming and their lives since the show ended.

Since filming ended, Sam moved back with her parents to Chesapeake, Virginia, where she performs her drag king show. Frank moved to Los Angeles, where he is searching for employment and a graduate school. He also keeps in touch with Alex, who returned to Los Angeles, where she lives with her boyfriend Byron. Nate went home for five days, but quickly returned to San Diego to follow up on his business, The Living Memoir, and hopes to develop a relationship with Michelle. San Diego native Priscilla returned home to her mother, where she is attending the University of California, Davis. Ashley returned home to Connecticut, and maintains a long-distance relationship with Zach, who returned home to Brighton, Michigan, where he works as a personal trainer. He stated that he enjoys his "Michigan housemates" better than his Real World housemates.

Among the topics discussed was Zach's and Ashley's tendency to separate themselves from the rest of the group. Frank's issues with his bisexuality, as well as his frustration over a lack of a relationship with Zach and Ashley, were also discussed. Sam and Frank took exception to Zach's homophobic attitude, especially toward gays in the military. Zach in the end acknowledged that he was a bit ignorant due to his rather sheltered and conservative upbringing in a small Midwestern town and most of his prejudice had more to due with culture shock of being in a different environment than he was accustomed to in Michigan and that he has since become more tolerant of different sexual orientations since the filming of the show. The roommates felt that Ashley did not get to know the roommates well during their time (save Zach), with Nate opining that she was miscast. The roommates had mixed opinions as to who exhibited the greatest sexual prowess in the house, and were puzzled regarding Zach's and Ashley's decision to remain abstinent.

Frank Sweeney got engaged in 2015.

In 2016, Ashley Kelsey appeared on The Runner alongside Heather Rae Young. In 2019, Kelsey started dating National Football League player Kerryon Johnson. In late 2020, the couple announced they were expecting their first child together. Their daughter, Snoh Marie Johnson, was born on June 8, 2021.

Alexandra Govere kept releasing music under the name Shungudzo. She has co-written a number of hit songs such as Little Mix's "Touch" and has released a song on the Fifty Shades Freed soundtrack titled "Come On Back". In 2018, she released her single, "Paper". In 2020, she released the single "Freedom for my People" in collaboration with DJ Oliver Heldens.

In 2019, Zach Nichols proposed to Jenna Compono from Real World: Ex-Plosion. The couple first met on the 26th season of The Challenge and appeared on multiple seasons together afterwards. In 2021, Nichols and Compono announced they were expecting their first child. After postponing the wedding to 2022 due to the COVID-19 pandemic, the couple had a more intimate ceremony on March 13, 2021. Their son, Anthony Joseph Nichols, was born on September 2, 2021. Their daughter, Liliana Marie, was born on December 27, 2022.

The Challenge

Challenges in bold indicate the cast member was a finalist on the Challenge.

Note: Frank made an appearance on Vendettas for an elimination.

References

External links
Official site. MTV.com
The Real World: San Diego: Cast Bios. MTV.com

Television shows set in San Diego
San Diego (2011)
2011 American television seasons
La Jolla, San Diego
Television shows filmed in California